Dundalk Marine Terminal is a neighborhood in southeast Baltimore, Maryland.

References

Neighborhoods in Baltimore
Southeast Baltimore